Theophil Joachim Heinrich Bienert (3 May 1833 – 5 April 1873) was a Baltic German botanist who lived and worked mainly in Imperial Russia.

Life and work
Theophil Joachim Heinrich Bienert was born in Kandava, in the Courland Governorate of the Russian Empire (present-day Latvia), and studied in Jelgava to become an apothecary. In 1858 he moved to Tartu in present-day Estonia and worked there as an assistant to the head of the Botanical Garden there. In 1858-59 he participated in the Russian Geographical Society's scientific expedition to Khorasan. He then stayed in Tartu until 1872, when he moved to Riga and took up a position at Riga Technical University. The genus Bienertia is named in honour of him by Alexander Bunge.

Selected writings
 Baltische Flora, enthaltend die in Esth-, Liv- u. Kurland wildwachsenden Samenpflanzen u. höheren Sporenpflanzen (1872)

References

1833 births
1873 deaths
People from Kandava
People from Courland Governorate
Baltic-German people
Academic staff of Riga Technical University
19th-century botanists from the Russian Empire